Mitchell Wade Meluskey (born September 18, 1973) is a retired professional baseball player. He played all or parts of five seasons in Major League Baseball, between 1998 and 2003, for the Houston Astros and Detroit Tigers, primarily as a catcher.

Professional career 
Meluskey played his entire career in the National League with the Astros except for 8 games with Detroit in 2002. He is best remembered by Astros fans for punching fellow Astro Matt Mieske in the eye during batting practice in on June 11, 2000. Meluskey was late for his turn to hit and then attempted to cut in front of Mieske. Heated words were exchanged and Meluskey proceeded to punch Mieske in the eye. Immediately afterwards Meluskey was hustled from the field while Mieske was treated on the ground for his injury. Astros star player Craig Biggio was upset over the incident and said, "To me, it has everything to do with respect. You know, some people have it and some people don't. I'm going to leave it at that. There's no way in the world something like that should happen."

On April 20, 1999, Meluskey hit his first major league home run off of Chicago Cubs pitcher Matt Karchner.

In 2000, Meluskey finished fifth in balloting for the National League Rookie of the Year award after hitting .300 with 14 home runs and 69 runs batted in. That same year, Mike Piazza had to drop out of the All-Star game after being hit in the head by a Roger Clemens fastball on July 8, 3 days earlier. NL manager Bobby Cox wanted Meluskey to be Piazza's replacement, but was unable to contact Meluskey due to Mitch being on a trip to South Padre Island, Texas. Chicago Cub Joe Girardi was selected instead. Meluskey retired in 2004, never making an All-Star team.

Personal life 
Meluskey resides in Yakima, Washington.

References

External links
, or Retrosheet
Pelota Binaria (Venezuelan Winter League)

1973 births
Living people
Baseball players from Washington (state)
Burlington Indians players (1986–2006)
Columbus RedStixx players
Detroit Tigers players
Houston Astros players
Jackson Generals (Texas League) players
Kinston Indians players
Kissimmee Cobras players
Major League Baseball catchers
Nashua Pride players
Navegantes del Magallanes players
American expatriate baseball players in Venezuela
New Orleans Zephyrs players
Sportspeople from Yakima, Washington
Round Rock Express players
Sacramento River Cats players
Somerset Patriots players